PTV News HD is a 24-hour Urdu News channel owned by the Pakistan Television Corporation. It also broadcast as Terrestrial television. PTV News is a cable and  satellite  news channel  launched in the face of tough international competition. Its objective is providing updated news round the clock and informs its viewers across the country on the latest newsworthy happenings on the national and international levels.

In May 2021, PTV News started broadcasting on YouTube with high definition transmission to start from June, 2021.

Programmes
 Riaasat
 Capital View
 10 Tak
 Shahrah e Dastoor
 45 Minute
 Sochna Hoga
 Sach Kay Sath
 Aaj Ka Pakistan
 Khabar Ki Khabar
 Samaaj
 Dunya Kay 7
 Brunch Talk
 Subh e Pakistan
 Baat Karobar Ki
 Economy in Focus
 Qanoon Bolta Hai
 Sports 360
 Badal Raha Hai Pakistan
 Current Affairs Special
 KPK Diary
 Balochistan Hour
 Explore Kashmir
 Kashmir Magazine
 Kashmir Report
 Kabul Hour
 Cabinet Hour
 Parliament Roundup
 Meri Awaz
 Pak China Express
 Real Pakistani
 Khabarnama
 Sheh Surkhiyan
 Arabic News
 Shina News
 Balti News
 Kashmiri News
 Gojri News

See also
PTV Home 
PTV National
PTV Global
List of Pakistani television stations

References

External links

Legislature broadcasters
Pakistan Television Corporation
24-hour television news channels in Pakistan
State media
Television channels and stations established in 2007
Television stations in Islamabad